Aaron Payas (born 24 May 1985) is a Gibraltarian footballer who plays for Bruno's Magpies previously and the Gibraltar national team, where he plays as a midfielder.

International career
 
Payas was first called up to the Gibraltar senior team in February 2014 for friendlies against Faroe Islands and Estonia on 1 and 5 March 2014. He made his international début with Gibraltar on 1 March 2014 in a 4-1 home loss with the Faroe Islands. His second appearance came a 2-0 home loss to Estonia on 5 March 2014.

International goals
Scores and results list Gibraltar's goal tally first.

Personal life
Outside of football Aaron is a lawyer for Hassans, the biggest law firm in Gibraltar.

References

External links

 
 
 

1985 births
Living people
Gibraltarian footballers
Gibraltar international footballers
Association football midfielders
F.C. Bruno's Magpies players
Glacis United F.C. players
Lincoln Red Imps F.C. players
Manchester 62 F.C. players
Gibraltar Premier Division players
Gibraltar pre-UEFA international footballers